Measure B was a 2012 Los Angeles County referendum to require adult film performers to use condoms when shooting scenes.

Measure B may also refer to:

Measure B, a 1996 referendum to fund the Mountain View–Winchester (VTA) light rail line in Northern California
Measure B, a 2005 referendum that was one of several initiated as part of the Dalidio Ranch Project controversy
Measure B, a 2005 referendum to fund schools for the city of Piedmont, California
Measure B, a 2007 referendum to create the Twin Rivers Unified School District
Measure B, a 2000 and 2008 referendum to fund expansion of Bay Area Rapid Transit in Alameda County
Measure B, a 2008 referendum to repeal the decriminalization of non-medical cannabis in Mendocino County, California
Measure B, a 2012 referendum that made changes to the San Mateo County Board of Supervisor voting requirements

See also
Missouri Proposition B (1999), a 1999 Missouri proposition (referred to in some sources as a "Measure") that would have required local police authorities to issue concealed weapons permits to eligible citizens